Elena Viktorovna Karpova (born 14 June 1980 in Leningrad) is a Russian basketball player.

She was drafted into the WNBA by the Washington Mystics in 2001. She later played for several Russian teams and one in the Czech Republic before ending her basketball career in 2009.

Karpova competed as a power forward for the Russian National Team at the 2004 Summer Olympics, winning the bronze medal.

References

1980 births
Living people
Basketball players at the 2004 Summer Olympics
Medalists at the 2004 Summer Olympics
Olympic basketball players of Russia
Olympic bronze medalists for Russia
Olympic medalists in basketball
Russian women's basketball players
Basketball players from Saint Petersburg
Washington Mystics draft picks